The Storm is the second studio album from American singer-songwriter ZZ Ward, released on Hollywood Records on June 30, 2017. The album reached number 1 on the Billboard Blues Albums chart.

Production
Ward has said The Storm is influenced by the music of blues artists including Howlin' Wolf, Robert Johnson and Big Mama Thornton. Prior to the album's release, on March 2, 2017, Ward released the single "The Deep", featuring Chicago MC Joey Purp. The track is built around a sample of "As Long As I've Got You" by The Charmels, which is also sampled in "C.R.E.A.M." by Wu-Tang Clan. The track "Ride" featuring Gary Clark, Jr. was originally featured in the 2017 Pixar film Cars 3. Ward performed the song on Dancing with the Stars on April 17, 2017. The music video for the single "Cannonball" was released in July 2017; it features blues singer Fantastic Negrito, with Ward playing harmonica on the song.

Track listing

Personnel

 ZZ Ward – vocals, guitars, harmonica, drum programming, percussion, engineering
 Trevor Brown – guitars, bass, background vocals
 Erick Walls – guitars
 Jonathan Keller – guitars, bass, drum programming, percussion, engineering 
 Theron "Neff U" Feemster – piano, keyboards, guitars, drum programming, string arrangements, engineering
 Rich Parry – drum programming, percussion, engineering
 Gary Clark, Jr. – guitars
 Fantastic Negrito – vocals
 Michael Fitzpatrick – vocals, keyboards, drum programming, engineering
 Ludwig Göransson – programming, keyboards, guitars, bass, vocal engineering
 Bianca McClure – violin
 Thomas Drayton – bass
 Zaire Koalo – background vocals
 Warren "Oak" Felder – programming, engineering, background vocals
 E. Kidd Bogart – engineering, background vocals
 Jabari Tawiah – engineering
 Kyle Mann – engineering
 Paul Redel – engineering
 Gavin Paddock – engineering
 Bobby Holland – engineering
 Tyler Beans – engineering
 Rich Costey – mixing
 Neal Pogue – mixing
 Dave Bassett – mixing, vocal recording
 Chris Gehringer – mastering

Chart history

References

2017 albums
Blues rock albums by American artists
Hollywood Records albums
Albums produced by Oak Felder